Åge Roar Maridal (born 11 April 1965) is a retired Norwegian football midfielder.

In 1986 he went from minnows Brattvåg IL to second-tier team Hødd. Praised as Sunnmøre's best player of 1986, he was picked up by first-tier team IK Start. Following a stint in Namsos IL, he returned to the first tier in 1991 with Fyllingen Fotball. He spent two years in Brattvåg before moving on to Stordal IL.

References

1965 births
Living people
People from Haram, Norway
Norwegian footballers
Brattvåg IL players
IL Hødd players
IK Start players
Fyllingen Fotball players
Norwegian First Division players
Eliteserien players
Association football midfielders
Sportspeople from Møre og Romsdal